Gruzskoye is a rural locality (a selo) and the administrative center of Gruzchanskoye Rural Settlement, Borisovsky District, Belgorod Oblast, Russia. The population was 1,033 as of 2010. There are 8 streets.

Geography 
Gruzskoye is located 19 km southwest of Borisovka (the district's administrative centre) by road. Zozuli is the nearest rural locality.

References 

Rural localities in Borisovsky District